Harberger-Laursen-Metzler effect is the conjecture that a terms of trade deterioration will cause a decrease in savings and a deterioration of the current account. This is due to the decrease in real income, which will cause an increase in real expenditure (in order to maintain a standard of living). The theory was offered by Harberger (1950) and Laursen and Metzler (1950).

See also
Terms of trade
Prebisch–Singer hypothesis

References

International trade theory